Rathbone Hills is a line of low hills or nunataks, 14 nautical miles (26 km) long and trending east–west, located 4 nautical miles (7 km) north of Guthridge Nunataks in the Gutenko Mountains of central Palmer Land. Mapped by United States Geological Survey (USGS) in 1974. Named by Advisory Committee on Antarctic Names (US-ACAN) for Maj. David L. Rathbone, United States Marine Corps (USMC), Commander of LC-130 aircraft in U.S. Navy Squadron VXE-6 during Operation Deep Freeze, 1970 and 1971.

See also
Mount Mumford, the central summit 4 nautical miles (7 km) north of the west end of Rathbone Hills

References

External links

Nunataks of Palmer Land